The Union City Reds was an American basketball team based in Union City, New Jersey that was a member of the Metropolitan Basketball League and the American Basketball League.

After the 1933/34 season the team moved to North Bergen and became the Jersey Reds.

Year-by-year

Notable players
Notable players with the Original Celtics include:
Lou Bender (1910–2009), pioneer player with the Columbia Lions and in early pro basketball, who was later a successful trial attorney.

References

Defunct basketball teams in the United States
Basketball teams in New Jersey
Union City, New Jersey
Sports in Hudson County, New Jersey